Ronnie Quintarelli (born 9 August 1979) is an Italian racecar driver, currently competing in Super GT. A four-time champion, he holds the all-time record for the most drivers' championship titles won in the GT500 class of Super GT.

Biography
Quintarelli first encountered motorsports at age 6 when his father gave him a small go-kart. After starting his karting career in 1990, he scored two second place finishes in the World Formula Super A championship and a European Formula C title. He made his single seaters debut in 2000 when he entered the Italian Formula Renault Championship and ended up third with Prema Powerteam. He also entered the Eurocup Formula Renault 2.0, the German Formula Three Championship and the Formula Volkswagen Germany.

In 2005, he scored his maiden GT win in the 1000 km Suzuka race with André Couto and Hayanari Shimoda and later made his way to the Super GT. After spending two seasons under the Lexus banner, Quintarelli moved to the Nissan camp, securing multiple victories. Driving for the Mola team, he won two consecutive titles in 2011 and 2012 partnered by Masataka Yanagida. He later joined the Nismo Official Team alongside Tsugio Matsuda. The pairing cruised to two more titles in 2014 and 2015 which made Quintarelli the most titled driver in the history of the series. While still fighting for the title in 2016 with a third place, the Nissan teams struggled at the beginning of the following year but Quintarelli and  Matsuda rallied to finish the season in second place. In 2018, they were again steadily at the front of the Nissan roster, and managed to snatch a win at Fuji Speedway. Unfortunately, they would not hit the top-5 again, eventually taking eighth place in the championship. 

In 2019, the Nismo pairing completed the championship in third position with four podium finishes and three pole positions scored by Quintarelli himself. In 2020, they remained in contention for the title until the very last race by taking two wins in the two rounds held at Suzuka. The final event of the season at Fuji Speedway (the track hosted four events to simplify logistics during the COVID-19 pandemic) saw a record 11 teams in contention for the title with tight margins. Quintarelli moved from sixth place to the lead in the opening lap, although tyre issues cost him track position later. He and Matsuda would eventually end up ninth in the race and sixth in the championships. They returned to the Nismo team for 2021.

The 2021 season started with a double retirement as contact involving team-mate Tsugio Matsuda at Okayama and a broken engine at Fuji Speedway impacted the rest of the season. 
The number 23 Nismo car still secured one win at Suzuka and a third place at Autopolis, but the Quintarelli-Matsuda pairing had to settle for ninth in points. For the 2022 season, all the Nissan teams debuted the new Z GT500 model. However, the Nismo team suffered the tragic loss of its Director Yutaka Suzuki, who prematurely passed away during the winter. Despite the positive start at Okayama with a third place, contact and a mechanical issue jeopardized the following two events. A brilliant second place in wet conditions at Sugo put Quintarelli and Matsuda back in title contention. Unfortunately, two more technical problems in the two final events at Autopolis and Motegi forced the pairing to seventh place in the standings.

Finishing in 3rd in Okayama International Circuit in the first race of the 2022, the Italian driver extended his all-time record streak in Super GT to 15th consecutive year at least 1 podium/season as a non-Japanese driver.

Personal life
Based in Yokohama, Kanagawa. Quintarelli speaks Japanese fluently and serves as a TV color commentator for the Super Formula series. In recent years, he devoted his efforts towards the people affected by earthquakes, raising awareness and providing support to the 2011 Tōhoku earthquake and tsunami relief. Together with fellow Super GT regular Andrea Caldarelli, he led a fundraising campaign in favour of the populations impacted by the 2016–2017 Central Italy earthquakes. His cross-border charity efforts, together with his sporting results, earned him the title of Officer of the Order of the Star of Italy.

Awards
 5th Class/Officer: Order of the Star of Italy: 2015

Racing record

Career summary

† As Quintarelli was a guest driver, he was ineligible to score championship points.

Complete Formula Nippon results
(key) (Races in bold indicate pole position) (Races in italics indicate fastest lap)

‡ Half points awarded as less than 75% of race distance was completed.

Complete Super GT results
(key) (Races in bold indicate pole position) (Races in italics indicate fastest lap)

‡ Half points awarded as less than 75% of race distance was completed.

Records

All-time Super GT records
:

References

External links

1979 births
Living people
Italian racing drivers
Italian Formula Renault 2.0 drivers
Formula Nippon drivers
Japanese Formula 3 Championship drivers
Super GT drivers
Karting World Championship drivers
Grand Champion Series drivers
Deutsche Tourenwagen Masters drivers
Formula Renault Eurocup drivers
Prema Powerteam drivers
Cram Competition drivers
Kondō Racing drivers
Nismo drivers